Ben Hood (born 1980) is an Australian politician who was appointed a member of the South Australian Legislative Council in February 2023, representing the South Australian Division of the Liberal Party of Australia. He replaced retiring member Stephen Wade.

Early life and career
Hood grew up in Naracoorte. He is a director of Hello Friday, a web and branding development agency. He co-created the children's character George the Farmer, which featured in a 2018 animated TV series developed with the South Australian Film Corporation. In June 2018, he was named one of InDaily's inaugural "40 under 40".

Political career
Hood has served as a councillor and deputy mayor for the City of Mount Gambier and as an inaugural board member of Landscape SA Limestone Coast. He stood as the Liberal candidate for the House of Assembly seat of Mount Gambier in the 2022 election but was unsuccessful against incumbent independent Troy Bell. 

Hood was one of two candidates to fill the Liberal vacancy in the Legislative Council after the early retirement of former Health Minister Stephen Wade. Opposition leader David Speirs pushed for a woman to fill the spot, and reportedly told Hood "he did not have his support, would have limited promotion and warned of a strategic blunder" by not continuing to seek a seat in the lower house. Hood is aligned with the Right faction of the party.

Personal life
Hood is married to Ellen and they have three children. He lives in Mount Gambier. His sister Lucy is the Labor member for Adelaide.

References

Liberal Party of Australia members of the Parliament of South Australia
1980 births
Living people
21st-century Australian politicians